Nathan Hale High School may refer to:

 Nathan Hale High School (Oklahoma), United States
 Nathan Hale High School (Washington), United States
 Nathan Hale High School (Wisconsin), United States
 Nathan Hale-Ray High School, Connecticut, United States

See also
 Nathan Hale (disambiguation)
 Hale High School (disambiguation)